Kuchurhan may refer to the following places in Ukraine:

Odessa Oblast
 Kuchurhan, Rozdilna Raion, a village in Rozdilna Raion
 Kuchurhan, Velyka Mykhailivka Raion, a village in Velyka Mykhailivka Raion

Other
Kuchurhan (river), river in Eastern Europe